Royston Park is a suburb of Adelaide in the City of Norwood Payneham St Peters. This is a narrow suburb at a little more than 200 m wide. Royston Park is bordered by Joslin and Marden, along with the River Torrens.

Royston Park's most notable residents include Adelaide ABC radio presenter Roger Willis.

The Royston Park Post Office closed in 1975.

References

Suburbs of Adelaide